The Dominican Republic men's national volleyball team represents the Dominican Republic in international volleyball competitions. In the 1950s the squad twice ended up in fourth place at the Pan American Games (1955 and 1959). The dominant forces in men's volleyball in North and Central America are Cuba and the United States.

Results

World Championship
 1974 – 22nd place
  2018 – 24th place

Challenger Cup
 2023 – Qualified

NORCECA Championship
1969 – Did not enter
1971 – Did not enter
1973 – 6th place
1975 – Did not enter
1977 – 7th place
1979 – 4th place
1981 – 6th place
1983 – Did not enter
1985 – 4th place
1987 – 4th place
1989 – 6th place
1991 – 5th place
1993 – Did not enter
1995 – 6th place
1997 – 7th place
1999 – Did not enter
2001 – 4th place
2003 – Did not enter
2005 – 4th place
2007 – 5th place
2009 – 6th place
2011 – Did not enter
2013 – 6th place
2015 – Did not enter
2017 –  Silver medal
2019 – 6th place

Pan-American Cup
2006 –  Silver medal
2007 – 5th place
2008 –  Bronze medal
2009 –  Bronze medal
2010 – 6th place
2011 – 8th place
2012 –  Bronze medal
2013 – 6th place
2014 – 8th place
2015 – 8th place
2016 – 6th place
2017 – 6th place
2018 – 10th place
2019 – 9th place
2021 – 4th place
2022 – 7th place

America Cup
2007 – 6th place

Squads

2007 NORCECA Championship
Head Coach: Jacinto Campechano

References

External links
 Sports123
 NORCECA Rankings 1969-1999

Volleyball
Dominican Republic
Volleyball in the Dominican Republic
Men's sport in the Dominican Republic